The lesser musky fruit bat (Ptenochirus minor) is a species of megabat in the family Pteropodidae. It is endemic to the Philippines.

References

Ptenochirus
Mammals of the Philippines
Mammals described in 1979
Endemic fauna of the Philippines
Fauna of Mindanao
Fauna of Bohol
Fauna of Samar
Fauna of Leyte
Fauna of Dinagat Islands
Fauna of Biliran
Taxonomy articles created by Polbot
Bats of Southeast Asia